Observatorio Astronómico de Forcarei (Spanish entry)

Location 

The observatory is located at 670m altitude, on a hill three miles from Forcarei, on the road from A Estrada.

Equipment and facilities 

It is a two floor building: there are also several outbuildings at ground level; the main telescope is on the upper one, within a 4m dome. The telescope has a 50 cm reflector with a focal aperture of ca.4 meters and is equipped with a 4008 x 2672 pixel CCD camera.

History 

The observatory was opened on 13 March 2009. Public night sessions were first held the same year after Easter.
The observatory hosted the 1st Astronomical Meeting as part of the International Year of Astronomy.

References

 Artículo El observatorio astronómico de Forcarei abrirá al público después de Semana Santa en La Voz de Galicia, (accessed 31 January 2019)
 Atlántico Diario
 El Observatorio Astronómico de Forcarei, que promovió Vigo, estrena telescopio atlantico.net, (accessed 31 January 2019)

Astronomical observatories in Spain